Philotheca glabra is a species of flowering plant in the family Rutaceae and is endemic to the inland south-west of Western Australia. It is a small shrub with elliptical to club-shaped leaves and white flowers tinged with pink and arranged singly or in twos or three on the ends of branchlets.

Description
The ten stamens are free from each other and woolly-hairy.

Taxonomy and naming
This philotheca was first formally described in 1970 by Paul Wilson who gave it the name Eriostemon glaber and published the description in the journal Nuytsia from specimens collected by Max Koch near Cowcowing in 1904. In 1998, Wilson changed the name to Philotheca glabra in the same journal.

Distribution and habitat
Philotheca glabra grows in heathland between Mullewa and Wubin in the inland south-west of Western Australia.

Conservation status
This species is classified as "not threatened" by the Department of Environment and Conservation (Western Australia).

References

glabra
Flora of Western Australia
Sapindales of Australia
Plants described in 1970
Taxa named by Paul G. Wilson